Piter FM is a  2006 Russian romantic comedy-drama film directed by Oksana Bychkova and starring Ekaterina Fedulova, Yevgeny Tsyganov and Alexey Barabash. The plot revolves around the serendipitous and unexpected romance between a young man and woman living in St. Petersburg.

Plot
Masha is a young woman working for a popular St. Petersburg radio station as a DJ. Maksim is a young man with a degree in architecture who has moved to St. Petersburg from Nizhny Novgorod and who works part-time as a street sweeper. Although Masha and Maksim have never met, they share a common trait: both have a tendency to be clumsy in daily life, always dropping and spilling things. Each is also at a crossroads in their lives. Masha is getting ready to marry her old schoolmate, Kostya, while Maksim has just won an international architecture competition and is preparing to move to Germany for a new job.

Masha accidentally bumps into somebody in a crowd and drops her cell phone while Maksim happens to pick it up. He wants to return it, but each time they try to meet, something happens to waylay their plans. The two keep ending up in the same places, but not knowing what the other looks like, they keep unwittingly passing by each other. In the meantime, Masha begins to realize that she is not in love with Kostya and agreeing to marry him was a rash decision on her part, while Maksim starts to think that he would rather live in St. Petersburg than move to Germany.

Cast
 Ekaterina Fedulova as Masha
 Yevgeny Tsyganov as Maksim
 Alexey Barabash as Kostya
 Irina Rakhmanova as Lera
 Natalya Reva-Ryadinskaya as Marina
 Oleg Dolin as Fedor
 Yevgeny Kulakov as Vitya
 Kirill Pirogov as Gleb
 Aleksandr Bashirov as building manager
 Vladimir Mashkov as man in slippers
 Tatyana Kravchenko as Tatyana Petrovna
 Pavel Barshak as guy with flowers
 Andrey Krasko man in shorts

Reception
Piter FM received generally positive reviews.

Awards
Piter FM was nominated for 6 different awards at the MTV Russia Movie Awards, 2007.

References

External links 
Official Website

2006 films
2000s Russian-language films
2006 romantic comedy-drama films
Russian romantic comedy-drama films